The 2017 Women's Africa Cup Sevens was a women's rugby sevens tournament held in Monastir, Tunisia on 16–17 September 2017. This tournament serves as a qualifier for two tournaments:
 2018 Rugby World Cup Sevens, with the winner representing Africa.
 2018 Commonwealth Games, with the two best-performing members of the Commonwealth of Nations qualifying.

Teams

Pool stage

Pool A

Pool B

Knockout stage

Cup

Fifth Place

Standings

See also
 2018 Rugby World Cup Sevens qualifying – Women
 Rugby sevens at the 2018 Commonwealth Games
 2017 Africa Cup Sevens (Men)

References

2017
2017 rugby sevens competitions
2017 in African rugby union
rugby union
International rugby union competitions hosted by Tunisia
2017 in women's rugby union